Wilkerson is a census-designated place (CDP) in Inyo County, California, United States. The population was 563 at the 2010 census, up from 562 at the 2000 census.

Geography

Demographics

2010
The 2010 United States Census reported that Wilkerson had a population of 563. The racial makeup of Wilkerson was 524 (93.1%) White, 0 (0.0%) African American, 13 (2.3%) Native American, 5 (0.9%) Asian, 1 (0.2%) Pacific Islander, 5 (0.9%) from other races, and 15 (2.7%) from two or more races. Hispanic or Latino of any race were 53 persons (9.4%).

The Census reported that 563 people (100% of the population) lived in households, 0 (0%) lived in non-institutionalized group quarters, and 0 (0%) were institutionalized.

There were 244 households, out of which 55 (22.5%) had children under the age of 18 living in them, 151 (61.9%) were opposite-sex married couples living together, 14 (5.7%) had a female householder with no husband present, 8 (3.3%) had a male householder with no wife present.  There were 10 (4.1%) unmarried opposite-sex partnerships, and 1 (0.4%) same-sex married couples or partnerships. 65 households (26.6%) were made up of individuals, and 31 (12.7%) had someone living alone who was 65 years of age or older. The average household size was 2.31.  There were 173 families (70.9% of all households); the average family size was 2.76.

The population was spread out, with 100 people (17.8%) under the age of 18, 22 people (3.9%) aged 18 to 24, 88 people (15.6%) aged 25 to 44, 238 people (42.3%) aged 45 to 64, and 115 people (20.4%) who were 65 years of age or older.  The median age was 51.2 years. For every 100 females, there were 101.1 males.  For every 100 females age 18 and over, there were 97.9 males.

The homeowner vacancy rate was 1.5%; the rental vacancy rate was 4.3%.  466 people (82.8% of the population) lived in owner-occupied housing units and 97 people (17.2%) lived in rental housing units.

2000
As of the census of 2000, there were 562 people, 234 households, and 160 families residing in the CDP. The racial makeup of the CDP was 94.66% White, 0.18% Native American, 0.71% Asian, 1.07% from other races, and 3.38% from two or more races.  5.16% of the population were Hispanic or Latino of any race.

There were 234 households, out of which 27.8% had children under the age of 18 living with them, 56.8% were married couples living together, 4.7% had a female householder with no husband present, and 31.2% were non-families. 27.4% of all households were made up of individuals, and 13.2% had someone living alone who was 65 years of age or older.  The average household size was 2.40 and the average family size was 2.89.

In the CDP, the population was spread out, with 23.3% under the age of 18, 5.9% from 18 to 24, 21.2% from 25 to 44, 32.6% from 45 to 64, and 17.1% who were 65 years of age or older.  The median age was 45 years. For every 100 females, there were 105.1 males.  For every 100 females age 18 and over, there were 100.5 males.

The median income for a household in the CDP was $35,583, and the median income for a family was $55,625. Males had a median income of $39,750 versus $22,981 for females. The per capita income for the CDP was $20,182.  None of the families and 4.6% of the population were living below the poverty line, including no under eighteens and 3.1% of those over 64.

Politics

References

Census-designated places in Inyo County, California
Census-designated places in California